Willard may refer to:

People
 Willard (name)

Geography

Places in the United States 
 Willard, Colorado
 Willard, Georgia
 Willard, Kansas
Willard, Kentucky
 Willard, Michigan, a small unincorporated community in Beaver Township, Bay County, Michigan
 Willard, Missouri
 Willard, New Mexico
 Willard, New York
 Willard, North Carolina
 Willard, Ohio
 Willard, Utah
 Willard Bay, Utah, a reservoir
 South Willard, Utah
 Willard, Virginia
 Willard, Washington
 Willard, Rusk County, Wisconsin, a town
 Willard, Clark County, Wisconsin, an unincorporated community
 Willards, Maryland

Places other than settlements 
 The Willard InterContinental Washington, a historic hotel in Washington, DC
 Willard House (disambiguation), several houses
 Willard Residential College, a Northwestern University residential hall
 J. Willard Marriott Library, at the University of Utah
 University of Illinois Willard Airport
 Willard Drug Treatment Center, a specialized state prison in New York focused on treatment of drug-addicted convicts
 Willard Park (Cleveland park), a park in downtown Cleveland, Ohio

Entertainment

In fictional characters
 Willard Decker, fictitious character in the Star Trek universe
 Willard Whyte, character from the James Bond film Diamonds Are Forever
 Captain Willard, in Apocalypse Now

In film
 Willard (1971 film), a 1971 horror movie
 Willard (2003 film), a 2003 film based on the same story as the 1971 film

In music
 Willard (album), a 1970 album by John Stewart
 Willard (band), an early grunge band from Seattle
 The Willard, a Japanese punk rock band
 Willard Grant Conspiracy, an alt-country band from Massachusetts/California

Other uses
 Emma Willard School, in Troy, New York
 Simon Willard clocks, produced in Massachusetts
 Willard Group, a financial gathering also known as G22
 Trivers–Willard hypothesis in evolutionary biology
 USS Willard Keith (DD-775), United States Navy ship
 A vehicle in the Grand Theft Auto series

See also
 Justice Willard (disambiguation)